Mo Duc High School is located in Mo Duc district in Quang Ngai in central Vietnam. It was founded in 1908.

High schools in Vietnam